Eric Agol (born May 13, 1970 in Hollywood, California ) is an American astronomer and astrophysicist who was awarded a Guggenheim Fellowship in 2017.

Career 
Agol is a professor and astrophysicist at the University of Washington in the Department of Astronomy. He obtained a B.A. in Physics and Mathematics from University of California, Berkeley in 1992 and a PhD in Physics from University of California, Santa Barbara in 1997 with Omer Blaes. He was awarded a Chandra Postdoctoral Fellowship in 2000, which he took to Caltech. He arrived at the University of Washington in 2003 as an Assistant Professor, and was promoted to the rank of full Professor in 2014.  He advised former graduate student Jason Steffen and former postdoc Sarah Ballard.

Research 
In 2000, together with Fulvio Melia and Heino Falcke, he proposed the possibility of observing the event horizon of the supermassive black hole in the center of the Milky Way (Sagittarius A *) with interconnected radio telescopes (VLBI at submillimeter wavelengths). This was implemented as the Event Horizon Telescope which detected the shadow of the black hole in the galaxy M87 in 2019, confirming a prediction of General Relativity.

In 2003, he predicted the possibility of the discovery of gravitational lensing in binary stars with Kepler (for example, a white dwarf with a sun-like star), which was also observed with the telescope.

In 2005, he was one of the first to show that exoplanet transits can vary over time due to accompanying planets. He coined the term transit timing variation to describe this.

He proposed the measurement of the infrared phase-variations of Hot Jupiters with the Spitzer Space Telescope and invented the longitudinal mapping from the phase curve, creating a Weather map of the exoplanet HD 189733 b.
 
In 2011 he proposed that white dwarfs might support a habitable zone for planets which migrate inwards after the red giant phase, and that these could be found with transit surveys.  In 2020 a transiting giant planet was found to orbit a white dwarf near this zone with the TESS spacecraft.

He joined the Kepler Space Telescope team to discover the planet Kepler-36b.  He subsequently discovered the Earth-like planet Kepler-62f, which is 1.4 times the diameter of the Earth and is located in the Goldilock zone.   He also was part of the team which discovered the seven-planet system, TRAPPIST-1, including three Earth-like planets residing in the Goldilock zone.

He developed a fast Gaussian process technique based on the Rybicki Press algorithm which has been used to model stellar variability in data from the NASA TESS spacecraft.

Most recently he led a team which used transit-timing with the Spitzer Space Telescope to precisely characterize the Terrestrial Planets in the Trappist-1 system, showing that they share a common composition that differs from the terrestrial planets of the Solar System

Personal life
Agol is the identical twin brother of mathematician Ian Agol.

References 

American astrophysicists
21st-century American astronomers
1970 births
Living people
University of Washington faculty
UC Berkeley College of Letters and Science alumni
University of California, Santa Barbara alumni
American identical twins